Dryops similaris is a species of beetle belonging to the family Dryopidae.

It is native to Europe.

References

Dryopidae
Beetles described in 1936